T. A. Ramachandran (12 September 1912 – 13 April 1951) was an Indian cricket umpire. He stood in one Test match, India vs. West Indies, in 1948.

See also
 List of Test cricket umpires
 West Indian cricket team in India in 1948–49

References

1912 births
1951 deaths
Place of birth missing
Indian Test cricket umpires